Preschel is a surname. Notable people with the surname include:

Andreas Preschel (born 1961), East German judoka
Tovia Preschel (1922–2013), Austrian biographer, historian and journalist